"On My Level" is a song by American rapper Wiz Khalifa featuring fellow American rapper Too $hort released as the first promotional, and later third official single from the former's third studio album, Rolling Papers (2011). The song was written by the artists alongside producerJim Jonsin and co-producer Danny Morris. It was later sent to urban contemporary radio stations on May 28, 2011. The song debuted, and peaked at number fifty-two on the Billboard Hot 100 and has been certified Platinum by the RIAA.

Chart performance
The song debuted at number 52 on the Billboard Hot 100, then dropped to number 56 before falling off the chart. After being released as an official single, it re-entered at number 79 and remained on the charts for another seven weeks.

Music video
A music video was released for the song. It had both Wiz Khalifa and Too $hort, and featured cameos by Nipsey Hussle and DJ Drama.

Charts

Weekly charts

Year-end charts

Certifications

Release history

References

External links

2011 singles
2011 songs
Wiz Khalifa songs
Too Short songs
Song recordings produced by Jim Jonsin
Songs written by Jim Jonsin
Songs written by Danny Morris (music producer)
Songs written by Wiz Khalifa
Songs written by Too Short